Maurice Petit (born 30 October 1888, date of death unknown) was a Belgian footballer. He played in one match for the Belgium national football team in 1910.

References

External links
 

1888 births
Year of death missing
Belgian footballers
Belgium international footballers
Place of birth missing
Association football defenders